Actia lamia is the type species of the genus Actia of the family Tachinidae.

Range
It is a common European species, ranging extents from Italy in the south, to parts of Norway in the north, and from Great Britain (excluding Ireland) in the west to the Caucasus and parts of Siberia in the east.

Biology
 
Like most tachinids it is a parasitoid of Lepidoptera. Its biology has not been well studied, but it has been reared from species of Epiblema (microlepidoptera).

References

Diptera of Europe
Diptera of Asia
lamia
Insects described in 1838
Articles containing video clips